Rick Flens (born 11 April 1983 in Zaandam) is a Dutch former professional road bicycle racer, who competed between 2003 and 2015, for the ,  and  teams.

Major results

2001
 1st  Time trial, National Junior Road Championships
2002
 3rd Time trial, National Under-23 Road Championships
2005
 3rd ZLM Tour
 6th Overall Olympia's Tour
2006
 1st Stage 3 Tour de la Somme
 2nd Overall Tour du Poitou-Charentes
1st Stage 4
 3rd Overall Olympia's Tour
1st Prologue
 5th Omloop van het Houtland
 6th Overall Le Triptyque des Monts et Châteaux
2007
 1st Stage 5 (ITT) Danmark Rundt
 3rd Time trial, National Road Championships
 5th Overall Tour of Belgium
2008
 6th Overall Three Days of De Panne
2009
 3rd Time trial, National Road Championships
2010
 2nd Kuurne–Brussels–Kuurne
2011
 1st Stage 1 (TTT) Tirreno–Adriatico
 8th Overall Three Days of De Panne
2014
 8th Time trial, National Road Championships
2015
 2nd Time trial, National Road Championships

References

External links

Profile at Rabobank official website

1983 births
Living people
Dutch male cyclists
Sportspeople from Zaanstad
Cyclists from North Holland
20th-century Dutch people
21st-century Dutch people